Xuanwu District may refer to:

 Xuanwu District, Beijing, former district that was merged into Xicheng District
 Xuanwu District, Nanjing, Jiangsu